Sitana schleichi, the Suklaphantah sitana, is a species of agamid lizard endemic to Nepal.

Etymology
The species is named in honor of German herpetologist Hans Hermann Schleich (born 1952).

References

Other references
Schleich, Hans Hermann; Kästle, Werner (1998). "Sitana fusca spec. nov., a further species from the Sitana sivalensis-complex". Contributions to the herpetology of south-Asia (Nepal, India). Wuppertal: Fuhlrott-Museum. pp. 207–226.
Anders C, Kästle W (2002). In: Schleich HH, Kästle W (editors) (2002). Amphibians and Reptiles of Nepal. A.R.G. Gantner Verlag Kommanditgesellsch. 1,200 pp. . (Sitana schleichi, new species).
Kelaart, Edward Frederick (1854). "Catalogue of reptiles collected in Ceylon". Ann. Mag. Nat. Hist. (2) 13: 137–140.

External links
 

Sitana
Endemic fauna of Nepal
Reptiles of Nepal
Reptiles described in 2002